The 2022 season was North West Thunder's third season, in which they competed in the 50 over Rachael Heyhoe Flint Trophy and the Twenty20 Charlotte Edwards Cup. In the Charlotte Edwards Cup, the side finished third in Group B, winning two of their six matches. In the Rachael Heyhoe Flint Trophy, the side finished seventh in the group of eight, winning one of their matches.
 
The side was captained by Eleanor Threlkeld, who replaced Alex Hartley in the position at the start of the season, and coached by Paul Shaw. They played four home matches at Old Trafford Cricket Ground, two at Rookwood Cricket Ground, and one at Trafalgar Road Ground.

Squad

Changes
On 29 October 2021, it was announced that Phoebe Graham had joined the side from Northern Diamonds, signing a professional contract. It was also announced that Laura Jackson had signed a professional contract, having previously been on a temporary contract. On 14 April 2022, it was announced that Alex Hartley was standing down as captain of the side. On 11 May 2022, North West Thunder announced their 20-player squad for the season, confirming the signing of Shachi Pai from Lightning, and the departure of overseas player Piepa Cleary to the same team. At the same time, it was confirmed that Eleanor Threlkeld was the new captain of the side. On 2 July 2022, it was announced that Deandra Dottin was joining the side as an overseas player for their first four Rachael Heyhoe Flint Trophy matches, which was later extended to cover the rest of the tournament. Georgie Boyce left the side in September 2022, joining Lightning.

Squad list
 Age given is at the start of North West Thunder's first match of the season (14 May 2022).

Charlotte Edwards Cup

Group B

 advanced to the final

Fixtures

Tournament statistics

Batting

Source: ESPN Cricinfo Qualification: 50 runs.

Bowling

Source: ESPN Cricinfo Qualification: 5 wickets.

Rachael Heyhoe Flint Trophy

Season standings

 advanced to final
 advanced to the play-off

Fixtures

Tournament statistics

Batting

Source: ESPN Cricinfo Qualification: 100 runs.

Bowling

Source: ESPN Cricinfo Qualification: 5 wickets.

Season statistics

Batting

Bowling

Fielding

Wicket-keeping

References

North West Thunder seasons
2022 in English women's cricket